Eaton Hamilton  (born July 19, 1954) is a Canadian short story writer, novelist, essayist and poet, who goes by "Hamilton", 2021 legal name “Eaton Hamilton" and uses they/their pronouns.

Hamilton has published the novel Weekend (Arsenal Pulp Press 2016), three books of poetry, Body Rain (Brick Books 1992) and Steam-Cleaning Love (Brick Books 1993), Love Will Burst into a Thousand Shapes (Caitlin Press, 2014), a poetry chapbook (Going Santa Fe, winner of the League of Canadian Poets Poetry Chapbook prize) and two volumes of short fiction July Nights and Other Stories, (Douglas and McIntyre, 1991) and Hunger, (Oberon, 2001). They are also the author, under the pseudonymous name of Ellen Prescott, of the memoir Mondays are Yellow, Sundays are Grey retitled No More Hurt which was included on the Guardian's Best Book of the Year list and was a Sunday Times bestseller. Their books have been shortlisted for the BC Book Prizes, the ReLit Award, the VanCity Award, the Pat Lowther Award, the Ferro-Grumley Award, and the MIND Book Prize.

Their short work has appeared in such publications as En Route, The Sun, The New York Times, Maclean's, Geist, LARB, Guernica, the Missouri Review, Gay Magazine, Salon, The Rumpus, The Globe and Mail and Seventeen. They have won many awards for short work, including, twice, first prize in the CBC Literary Awards (2003/2014), 2015's Lit Pop Prize, judged by George Saunders, twice first prize in the Prism International Short Story Award, Canadian Poetry Chapbook of the Year from the League of Canadian Poets, the event Non-Fiction Award, and many others. They have had Notable essays in BAE multiple  times, and a Notable short story in BASS. Work has appeared in BAX 2020.

They were a litigant in the Canadian same-sex marriage case between 2000-2003. They spent several years as a photographer and for years volunteered for the organization Now I Lay Me Down to Sleep. Hamilton is also a visual artist. They have two grown daughters and four grandchildren. They are also a Master Gardener and visual artist.

Bibliography 
 Weekend, novel, Arsenal Pulp Press, 2016 
 Love Will Burst into a Thousand Shapes, poetry, Caitlin Press, 2014 
 No More Hurt, cnf, ebury/Random UK, 2011 
 Hunger, short fiction, Oberon Press 2002   (hardcover)   (softcover)
 Going Santa Fe, poetry, League of Canadian Poets, 1997, 
 Steam-Cleaning Love, poetry, Brick Books, 1993, 'Jessica's Elevator, Press Porcépic
 July Nights, short fiction, Douglas and McIntyre, 1992 
 Body Rain, poetry, Brick Books, 1991, 
 Jessica's Elevator, children's picture book, Press Porcépic, 1989, as J.A. Hamilton

Notable awards 
 Skinning the Rabbit, Notable, Best American Essays, 2018
 Wish You Were Here Best Canadian Poetry, 2016
 Never Say I Didn't Bring You Flowers, Notable, Best American Essays, 2016
 Battery, Lit Pop fiction, 2015, winner (judge: George Saunders)
 Smiley, CBC Canada Writes, fiction, 2014
 The Lost Boy, CBC Literary Awards, first prize, fiction, 2003
 Territory Journey Prize anthology, 1999
 Goombay Smash Prism Int'l Short Fiction Prize, first, 1998, Best Canadian Stories, 1999
 Graduation Journey Prize anthology, 1998
 How to Have Heart Disease (Without Really Trying) notable, Best American Short Stories, 1997
 Death in One Another's Arms story, cited, Pushcart Prize, 1989

Notable awards, books 
 Weekend was longlisted for the ReLit Award
 Going Santa Fe won the 1997 League of Canadian Poets Canadian Poetry Chapbook Award
 July Nights was short-listed for the VanCity Award and the Ethel Wilson Fiction Award in the BC Book Prizes
 Body Rain was short-listed for the Pat Lowther Award
 No More Hurt was shortlisted for the VanCity Award and the MIND book award
 Hunger, 2003 Publishing Triangle Awards, Ferro Grumley Prize, finalist, longlisted Lambda Literary Award, 2004

See also
 Lesbian Poetry

References

External links 
 Eaton Hamilton's writing web site
  review, Weekend
   review, Weekend
  review, Love Will Burst into a Thousand Shapes
  review, Love Will Burst into a Thousand Shapes
  Infarct, I Did
  Smiley
   Battery
  Never Say I Didn't Bring You Flowers
  Canadian Poetry Online
  Anne Malcolm interview, Montreal, 2014
   Westwood Creative Artists

Living people
Canadian lesbian writers
1954 births
20th-century Canadian poets
21st-century Canadian poets
Canadian women poets
Canadian LGBT poets
Canadian women short story writers
20th-century Canadian women writers
21st-century Canadian women writers
Chapbook writers
20th-century Canadian short story writers
21st-century Canadian short story writers
Canadian women novelists
21st-century Canadian novelists
21st-century Canadian LGBT people
20th-century Canadian LGBT people